The 2019 Gibtelecom Rock Cup was a single-leg knockout tournament contested by clubs from Gibraltar. There were seventeen clubs participating in the cup this season. The final was played on 26 May 2019. The winner of the competition qualified to compete in the 2019–20 Europa League.

Europa were the defending champions after defeating Mons Calpe by a score of 2–1 in the previous season's final.

First round
The draw for the first round was held on 29 November 2018. One first round match was played and all remaining clubs received a bye to the second round.

Second round
The draw for the second round took place on 23 January 2019. The ties were played between 6 and 10 February 2019. A total of 16 clubs played in this round; the winner of the first round, the remaining five teams from the Second Division and all ten teams from the Premier Division.

Quarter-finals
The draw for the quarter-finals took place on 15 February 2019. Two Second Division sides, Bruno's Magpies and Olympique 13, remained in the tournament. Ties were played on 12 and 13 March 2019.

Semi-finals

Final

Scorers
.

7 goals
  Tjay De Barr (Europa)
5 goals

  Matheus Assumpção (Bruno's Magpies)

4 goals

  Nathan Santos (Gibraltar United)
  Pibe (Mons Calpe)

3 goals

  Fernando Cuesta (Bruno's Magpies)
  Thomas Parry (Bruno's Magpies)
  Labra (Gibraltar Phoenix)
  Guido Ratto (Gibraltar United)
  Alberto Zapata (Gibraltar United)
  Leonardo Carboni (Mons Calpe)
  Juanse Pegalajar (Mons Calpe)
  José Luis Reyes (St Joseph's)

2 goals

  Israel Castillo (Boca Gibraltar)
  Finnlay Wyatt (Bruno's Magpies)
  Manuel Arana (Europa)
  Manu Dimas (Europa)
  Emil Peter Jørgensen (Europa)
  Liam Walker (Europa)
  Juan Manuel Llaves (Gibraltar Phoenix)
  Francisco Álvarez (Gibraltar United)
  Dani Ponce (Gibraltar United)
  Néstor Trecco (Mons Calpe)
  Alejandro Carenote (Olympique 13)
  Shawn Gonzalez (St Joseph's)
  Andrew Hernandez (St Joseph's)

1 goal

  Alex Dimitriu (Bruno's Magpies)
  Jamie Fortuna (Bruno's Magpies)
  Matthew Grech (Bruno's Magpies)
  Urko Arroyo (Europa)
  Ibrahim Ayew (Europa)
  Álex Quillo (Europa)
  Alan Parker (Glacis United)
  Cristofer Miñano (Gibraltar Phoenix)
  Jordan Serna (Gibraltar Phoenix)
  Tito De Torres (Gibraltar United)
  Aymen Mouelhi (Gibraltar United)
  Chico Rubio (Gibraltar United)
  Kike Gómez (Lincoln Red Imps)
  Javier Cantelmi (Lions Gibraltar)
  Mohamed Badr (Lynx)
  Ethan Britto (Mons Calpe)
  Jonathan Di Toro (Mons Calpe)
  Kelvin Morgan (Mons Calpe)
  Jonathan Pereyra (Mons Calpe)
  Francisco Zúñiga (Mons Calpe)
  Godwin Egbo (Olympique 13)
  Andrew Lopez (Olympique 13)
  Javi Anaya (St Joseph's)
  Ryan Casciaro (St Joseph's)
  Ernesto Cornejo (St Joseph's)
  Evan Green (St Joseph's)
  Iván Lobato (St Joseph's)

Own goals
  Ashley Harrison (Hound Dogs) - for St Joseph's
  Sergio Panes (College 1975) - for Mons Calpe
  Kalian Perez (Lions Gibraltar) – for Gibraltar Phoenix

See also
2018–19 Gibraltar Premier Division
2018–19 Gibraltar Second Division

References

External links
Gibraltar Football Association

Rock Cup
Rock Cup
Rock Cup